Angel is a 1984 American exploitation thriller film directed by Robert Vincent O'Neil, written by O'Neil and Joseph Michael Cala, and starring Donna Wilkes, Cliff Gorman, Susan Tyrrell, Dick Shawn, and Rory Calhoun. Its plot follows a teenage prostitute in Los Angeles who faces danger when a serial killer begins stalking and murdering young sex workers.

Released by New World Pictures, it was the first installment in the Angel film series.

Plot
Fifteen-year-old honor student Molly Stewart attends private prep school in the Los Angeles area in the daytime, but transforms herself to "Angel" at night: a leather mini-skirted, high-heeled street teenage prostitute who works Hollywood Boulevard. Angel has a "street family" made up of aging movie cowboy Kit Carson, street performer Yoyo Charlie, drag performer Mae, fellow hookers Crystal and Lana, and her landlady, eccentric painter Solly Mosler.

The street's dangers increase as a psycho-necrophiliac serial killer begins to stalk and murder prostitutes. Los Angeles Police Lt. Andrews is assigned to the case, but finds no leads. Tragedy strikes Angel's group of friends when Crystal becomes a victim.

The next day at school, Molly is confronted by teacher Patricia Allen, who is concerned about Molly's lack of extracurricular activities. Molly explains that her mother was paralyzed by a stroke and she has to head home immediately after school each day to care for her.

Lt. Andrews advises the hookers to work in pairs. Angel teams up with Lana. Lana takes a potential client to a motel room that she and Angel share.  When Angel shows up at the room with a client of her own a couple of hours later she finds Lana's body in the shower. Angel gives the police a description of the suspect and a composite sketch is made. The killer is brought in for a lineup and Angel recognizes him, but he shoots his way out of the police station and escapes.

Andrews takes Molly/Angel home to speak with her parents, but discovers that Molly's father left nine years ago and her mother abandoned her three years ago. Molly maintains the pretense of a mother at home so that she will not be sent to a foster home. She believes that her father will return someday. She has paid her rent, school tuition and living expenses through prostitution since she was 12.

Despite Andrews' warnings to stay off the street, Angel/Molly purchases a pistol and returns to work. Her masquerade falls apart that night when some classmates recognize her on the street. Word flashes through the students at her school and soon everyone knows that Molly spends her evenings as a Hollywood hooker.

The next day, Ms. Allen visits Molly's apartment and insists on meeting her mother. Mae pretends to be Molly's mother, but Allen is not fooled. Mae is still at the apartment when the killer shows up later. They fight, and he stabs her, leaving her mortally wounded. Solly discovers Mae and the two share a tender moment of friendship before Mae succumbs to her wounds.

Andrews and Molly return to her apartment and find Mae's body. Molly heads out on the streets with Solly's huge long-barreled Magnum to avenge Mae and Andrews goes after her. After a fight and chase, Carson, whom Andrews enlisted to help, shoots the killer. Molly, Andrews, and a wounded Carson walk off together.

Cast

 Donna Wilkes as Molly "Angel" Stewart
 Cliff Gorman as Lieutenant Andrews
 Susan Tyrrell as Solly Mosler
 Dick Shawn as Marvin Walker / Mae
 Rory Calhoun as Kit Carson
 John Diehl as The Killer
 Elaine Giftos as Patricia Allen
 Steven M. Porter as Charlie "Yoyo Charlie"
 Donna McDaniel as Crystal
 Graem McGavin as Lana

Release
Angel was released in theaters in the United States by New World Pictures on January 13, 1984. The film failed to open in the top 5 at the box office, yet grossed $2.2 million on its opening weekend. The film managed to stay in the box office top ten for several months, becoming a sleeper hit and eventually earning $17,488,564. It was New World's highest grossing picture that year.

Sequels
The film's cult following and box office profits were enough to spawn two sequels, although each with a different actress. The sequels were Avenging Angel (1985), starring Betsy Russell, and Angel III: The Final Chapter (1988), starring Mitzi Kapture. Each film performed less well at the box office. A failed pilot for a TV spinoff was released straight to video as Angel 4: Undercover (1993), starring Darlene Vogel, but was non-canonical to the previous films.

Production
The movie was filmed in 1983. Lead actress Donna Wilkes was actually twenty-four years old when she played fifteen-year-old Molly Stuart. She prepared for the role by talking to real-life street prostitutes on Hollywood Boulevard, spent time with the Los Angeles Police Department, and in various halfway houses for underage children living on the streets of Los Angeles.

Composer Craig Safan wrote the score to this film in less than a week. The film premiered at the Hollywood Pacific Theatre on Hollywood Boulevard. A fact sheet inside the theatre, prior to its closure in 1994, confirmed this. The theatre is also featured in the climax of the film, when a gun-toting Angel opens fire on the killer and terrifies the patrons outside.

The motel in the film is the El Royale Motel at 11117 Ventura Boulevard, Studio City. Most of the film was shot at real locations on and around Hollywood Boulevard.

Home video
In 2003, Anchor Bay Entertainment released the Region 1 DVD box set of the first three Angel films entitled The Angel Collection., and is also available on Blu-ray from Vinegar Syndrome.

Soundtrack
Craig Safan's score was released on compact disc by Intrada Records in 1993. In 2013 BSX Records released a compilation album called The Angel Trilogy, featuring Safan's album programme (plus a cover version of the Allies' "Something Sweet" as performed by Melody Michalski), Christopher Young's score for Avenging Angel (also previously released by Intrada) and Eric Allaman and Reinhard Scheuregger's music for Angel III: The Final Chapter.

References

External links
 
 
 The AFI Catalog of Feature Films:Angel
 

1984 films
1980s crime thriller films
1984 action thriller films
1984 LGBT-related films
1980s English-language films
American crime thriller films
American exploitation films
American high school films
American serial killer films
American LGBT-related films
American sexploitation films
Angel (film series)
Cross-dressing in American films
Films about prostitution in the United States
Films directed by Robert Vincent O'Neil
Films scored by Craig Safan
Films set in Los Angeles
Films shot in Los Angeles
New World Pictures films
1980s American films